

Airline operators
The List of McDonnell Douglas MD-80 operators lists the current operators of the aircraft, and any of its variants. As of February 2023, a total of 136 MD-80 aircraft (all variants) were in active service.

Former operators

References

MD-80
Operators